The 1972 New York Cosmos season was the second season for the New York Cosmos in the now-defunct North American Soccer League. In the Cosmos' second year of existence, the club finished 1st in the Northern Division and 1st in the overall league table.  In the playoffs, the Cosmos defeated the Dallas Tornado in the semifinal and the St. Louis Stars in the final, winning their first league championship and completing the first double by a club in the national era.

Squad  

 

Source:

Results 
Source:

Friendlies

Regular season 
Pld = Games Played, W = Wins, L = Losses, D = Draws, GF = Goals For, GA = Goals Against, Pts = Points
6 points for a win, 3 points for a draw, 0 points for a loss, 1 point for each goal scored (up to three per game).

Northern Division Standings

Overall League Placing 

Source:

Matches

Postseason

Overview

Semi-finals

Final

Matches

References

See also
1972 North American Soccer League season
List of New York Cosmos seasons

New York
American soccer clubs 1972 season
New York Cosmos seasons
New York Cosmos
Soccer Bowl champion seasons